is a Japanese model. She also works as a television presenter and actress. She comes from Gifu Prefecture. In 2009, while a university student, she was selected as the Toray swimwear girl. She is currently under an exclusive contract with the fashion magazine With.

In March 2013, she graduated from Rikkyo University. In 2013, she modelled shoes for Asbee. She is also appearing in NHK's "High School Course" on biology. She is appearing in a special commemorating twenty years of the television programme "Mezamashi Doyōbi".

Filmography
 Mata Itsuka Natsu ni (2011)
 Brave Hearts: Umizaru (2012)
 Tokyo Mujirushi Joshi Monogatari (2012)
 Fashion Story: Model (2012)
 Megamisama (2017)

Publications
 Chinami ni (swimwear photograph collection)

References

External links
 
 Blog "Chinami no Yorimichi"
 

Japanese female models
Japanese actresses
1989 births
Living people
Japanese gravure models
Japanese television personalities
Models from Gifu Prefecture